Jarbidge Peak is the second highest mountain in the Jarbidge Mountains of northern Elko County, Nevada, United States. It is located within the Jarbidge Ranger District of the Humboldt-Toiyabe National Forest. The boundary of the Jarbidge Wilderness crosses the peak.

"Jarbidge" is a name derived from the Shoshone language meaning "devil". Indians believed the hills were haunted.

Summit panorama

References

External links 
 

Mountains of Elko County, Nevada
Mountains of Nevada
Humboldt–Toiyabe National Forest